Mount Morkill is located on the border of Alberta and British Columbia, near McBride which is a town in British Columbia, a province of Canada, a country on the continent of North America. There is a subpeak to the southwest of the main peak, at an elevation of  named The Gazetted Peak. It was named in 1965 after D.B. Morkill, a British Columbia land surveyor.

See also
 List of peaks on the Alberta–British Columbia border
 Mountains of Alberta
 Mountains of British Columbia

References

Morkill
Morkill
Morkill